Barrettini is a small island of the Italian autonomous region of Sardinia. It is just north of the island of Sardinia. It is located east of Budelli on the north eastern part of Sardinia on the Tyrrhenian Sea.

Weather
Winters on the island can get very cold. One of the coldest months is February, and July is usually the sunniest month. Various types of precipitation occur throughout the year.

See also
 List of islands of Italy

Islands of Sardinia